Veerbhadra Temple, is situated in the holy Shri Kshetra Yadur, on the banks of holy river Krishna in Chikodi Taluka of Belagavi District, Karnataka, India, approximately 94 kilometres (58 mi) from Belgaum. It lies on the banks of the majestic Krishna River.

The shivalinga is also known as "Shri veerupakshalinga".

History
Veerashaiva, saint of Karnataka Shree, founded the temple in the 12th century. 

The holy temple is part of the endowment trust math and belongs to Brahmin & Veershaiva community.
The Kadsiddeshwar math mentor is the head of the temple. The devotees of the temple are spread all over in both state of 
Maharashtra and Karnataka. The temple authorities carry out various religious and cultural activities and rituals in consultation with Kadsiddkeshwar math authorities on various festivals throughout the year.

The Temple is mentored by Shivacharya Swamijee, Shree Siddharameshwar Hiremath, Hipparagi.
Under the leadership of Siddharameshwar Hiremath the Temple authorities are undertaking a number of developmental projects:

1. Yatri Nivas
2. Kalyan Mandap
3. Manjari Gate
4. Veerabhadreshwar Rath
5. Dasoh Hall
6. Swamijee Guest House
7. Kadsiddheshwar Math Dwar

Worship
The following poojas and Archana's take place on a regular basics on behalf of the various devotees:
Abhishek
Rudra Abhishek
Butti puja (obligation of cooked rice mixed with curds to Veerpaksha ling)
Yele Puja (The battle leaves are applied to veerpaksha ling in most decorative manner)
Akki puja (Decoration of veerpaksha ling by application of rice)
Dandavatha – The process by which devotees after taking dip in the holy river Krishna come to temple by putting a Suryanamaskar step by step.
Tula bhar seva– Depending upon devotees pledges, the devotees put the coconuts, rice etc. equivalent to their weight. On the back of "Veerupakshalinga" there is a Shrine of mother
" Bhadra Kalamma", depending upon vows, the devotees and the mother, "Bhadra kalamma" is offered various offerings by the devotees.

All the above puja activities and rituals are performed after taking the receipts from the temple authorities.

Activities
Marriages:  Many devotees carry out the marriages in the temple after prior registration with temple authorities
Jawal:  First time child's hair cutting ceremony
Guggula:  Many devotees, to complete their vows and pledges on heir behalf or on behalf of their family members and also to follow traditional vows perform the Guggula ceremony in the altar of "Veerupaksha linga"

Transportation

Road
Belagavi city is near to Yadur can be reached via the National Highways 4 and State Highways 12, NWKRTC run buses to all corners of Karnataka and to Yadur. There are many private buses which serve Yadur.

Air

Nearest airports are Belagavi and Hubli.

Rail
Nearest railway stations are Miraj, Rayabag, Kudachi , Belagavi  and Ghatprabha.

Shiva temples in Karnataka